Mesarthropterus wasmanni is a species of beetle in the family Carabidae, the only species in the genus Mesarthropterus.

References

Paussinae
Beetles described in 1915